Paidiscura orotavensis is a species of comb-footed spider in the family Theridiidae. It is found in the Canary Islands and Madeira.

References

Theridiidae
Spiders described in 1968